Balkan Stream is a pipeline which transports Russian natural gas from Turkey to Bulgaria, Serbia and Hungary. It is an extension of Turk Stream. Annual capacity is almost 16 bcm from Turkey and 1.8 bcm onwards to Serbia. 

The project is headed and financed by Srbijagas (or "South Stream Serbia AG"), the state-owned natural gas provider of Serbia.

External links
 Balkan Stream on Global Energy Monitor

References 

Natural gas pipelines in Serbia
Russia–Serbia relations
Bulgaria–Serbia relations
2018 establishments in Serbia
Natural gas pipelines in Turkey
Natural gas pipelines in Bulgaria
Natural gas pipelines in Hungary